The chestnut ermine moth (Argyresthia castaneella) was a species of moth in the  subfamily Argyresthiinae. It was endemic to the United States. The species was only seen in two states, New Hampshire and Vermont. It became extinct due to chestnut blight obliterating its primary food source, the American chestnut.

References

Argyresthia
Moths described in 1915
Endemic fauna of the United States
Extinct moths
Extinct insects since 1500
Moths of North America
Taxonomy articles created by Polbot